Abhandlungen aus dem Mathematischen Seminar der Universität Hamburg (English: Reports from the Mathematical Seminar of the University of Hamburg) is a peer-reviewed mathematics journal published by Springer Science+Business Media. It publishes articles on pure mathematics and is scientifically coordinated by the Mathematisches Seminar, an informal cooperation of mathematicians at the Universität Hamburg; its Managing Editors are Professors 
, 
. The journal is indexed by Mathematical Reviews and Zentralblatt MATH.

History 
The Abhandlungen were set up as a new journal by Wilhelm Blaschke in 1922 at the newly created Department of Mathematics (called Mathematisches Seminar) at the newly founded Hamburgische Universität.
Blaschke invited both Hermann Weyl and David Hilbert to the Mathematisches Seminar (in 1920 and 1921, respectively) to deliver talk series
their views on the Foundations of Mathematics. These talks formed part of the early history of the Grundlagenkrise der Mathematik and Hilbert's talk was published in the firs]t volume of the new journal.
The first volumes of the journal contain numerous papers of famous mathematicians such as
Paul Bernays,
Constantin Carathéodory,
G. H. Hardy & J. E. Littlewood,
Jacques Herbrand,
Ruth Moufang,
George Pólya, and
John von Neumann.

Until 1970, the Mathematisches Seminar was covering all of mathematics, including applied mathematics, stochastics, and statistics. After the
reform of the University, it became the research institute of pure mathematics. As an institution, the Mathematisches Seminar was dissolved in 1999 and the informal cooperation with the same name was formed.

Since 2007, the journal is published by Springer Science+Business Media.

List of Managing Editors 

The professors of the Mathematisches Seminar of the Universität Hamburg are serving as member of the editorial board
of the journal. Until volume 36, the editorial board consisted of the Directors of the Mathematisches Seminar and there was no Managing Editor. 
In those years, the following Hamburg professors were members of the editorial board:
,
Emil Artin,
Heinz Bauer,
Wilhelm Blaschke, 
Hel Braun,
Lothar Collatz,
Max Deuring,
Helmut Hasse,
Erich Hecke,
,
Erich Kähler,
Hans Rademacher,
Johann Radon,
Leopold Schmetterer,
Emanuel Sperner,
Ernst Witt,
Hans Zassenhaus.

Starting with volume 37, a pair of Managing Editors (Schriftleitung) was responsible for the administration of the editorial process.

References

Mathematics journals
Publications established in 1922
English-language journals
Springer Science+Business Media academic journals
University of Hamburg
Magazines published in Hamburg